Steve Pfauter ("Human")  (born November 7, 1963, in San Francisco, California, died June 12, 2022) was an American musician and set dresser and former bass guitarist for the punk rock band The Vandals, from 1980 until 1984.

Biography
Steve Pfauter was born to German immigrants and attended Los Alamitos High. He joined The Vandals in 1980 and played bass guitar on their debut EP, Peace thru Vandalism. Steve Human (A.K.A. Human T-shirt, Humann) designed T-shirts for T.S.O.L. and also did art work for the Dead Kennedys. He also played bass in the original Los Angeles punk rock band Detox, making two full-length albums which featured six songs he wrote while touring the US and Canada. Later he joined Ken All Night Rocker. Human also roadied for T.S.O.L. on their first two nationwide tours in 1980-1982. Once known for T-shirt designs, he owned his own silkscreen shop at age sixteen. He worked in the film industry as a set dresser and worked on productions such as Leaving Las Vegas, High Crimes and Spider-Man 3.

Discography

Studio Releases

The Vandals

Peace Thru Vandalism                (1982) (Epitaph  Records): Bass Guitarist

Detox 
Detox - S/T                      (1985) (Flipside Records): Bass Guitarist
Detox - We Don't Like You Either (1988) (Flipside Records): Bass Guitarist

References

External links 
Detox (2) - We Don't Like You Either, Discogs
Punkanada-US: Detox - S/T
Steven “Stevo” Jensen of the Vandals (1959-2005) punknews.org

American punk rock musicians
1963 births
Living people
Musicians from San Francisco
The Vandals members